Chrysoteuchia pyraustoides is a moth in the family Crambidae. It was described by Nikolay Grigoryevich Erschoff in 1877. It is found in Irkutsk Oblast, Russia.

References

Crambini
Moths described in 1877
Moths of Asia